Norman Washington Harllee ( - 1927) was an educator and advocate for African American education in the United States. He was born on the Harllee Plantation near Lumberton in Robeson County, North Carolina where he was enslaved. He taught himself to read and write using Webster's spelling book. He attended Biddle University. In the 1890s, he served as the  first superintendent of the Texas State Fair's Colored Department.

He served as principal of Dallas Colored High School. He advocated for an industrial school and state university for African Americans in Dallas.

He wrote several textbooks including Harllee's Tree of History, "a new and graphic method of teaching history", and Diagram System of Geography.

Daniel Wallace Culp included him and his photograph in his 1902 book Twentieth Century Negro Literature
Or, A Cyclopedia of Thought on the Vital Topics Relating to the American Negro.

An elementary school was named for him, the first school in Dallas to be named after an African American. An early learning center is named for him.

References

1840s births
1927 deaths
Year of birth uncertain
African-American educators
People from Robeson County, North Carolina
19th-century American slaves
Johnson C. Smith University alumni
American textbook writers